Michael John Knowles (born March 18, 1990) is an American conservative political commentator, actor, author, and media host. He has worked for The Daily Wire since 2016.

Early life and education
Knowles was born in Bedford Hills, New York, and graduated from Fox Lane High School. Descended from Italian, Sicilian and Irish immigrants, he states that his ancestry also includes four English members of the Mayflower voyage: Dr. Samuel Fuller, Stephen Hopkins, Francis Eaton, and John Billington.

Knowles began training as an actor with the Stella Adler Studio of Acting, as part of its Advanced Teen Conservatory. He graduated with a B.A. in history and Italian from Yale University, where he produced the first English rendering of Niccolò Machiavelli's play Andria in 2012. He was raised in the Catholic faith by his family, but fell away during his adolescence; at Yale he experienced a reconversion to the Church, spurred at first by ontological arguments.

Career

Acting 
Before graduating from Yale University, Knowles participated in two Web series, Never Do Business with Friends and Survive. Upon graduation, Knowles trained with Wynn Handman at his acting studio in New York City and appeared in various Web series, films, and television shows. In 2012, Knowles appeared in the student film House of Shades, in which Knowles's character has sex with another man.

After moving to Los Angeles, he acted in the television pilot in of I'm Back and in the television movies Life Coach and Blend In. He also starred as Alejandro in the comedy feature film Hóllyweird.

Political commentary
In 2016, Knowles was invited to join The Daily Wire, beginning as regular guest and cultural correspondent for The Andrew Klavan Show podcast. He had worked with Andrew Klavan's son, Spencer, on theater productions while they were undergraduates at Yale.

In 2018, Knowles reiterated his opposition to same-sex marriage and opposed attempts by some in the conservative movement to recognize such unions.

In April 2019, Knowles gave a speech at the University of Missouri–Kansas City titled "Men Are Not Women" on gender identity during his YAF national college speaking tour. Student protesters disrupted his talk, deeming it transphobic. One protester assaulted him and sprayed him with an unknown mixture, later determined to be lavender oil and other non-toxic household liquids. The protester was charged with assault and other violations. Chancellor C. Mauli Agrawal praised the protestors and condemned Knowles, alleging that Knowles "professed opinions do not align with our commitment to diversity and inclusion and our goal of providing a welcoming environment to all people." Agrawal also acknowledged how Knowles was treated "crossed a line". Many Missouri lawmakers were dissatisfied with Agrawal's response and threatened to cut the school's budget.

In September 2019, Knowles called climate activist Greta Thunberg a "mentally ill Swedish child" on the Fox News program The Story. Fellow segment guest and Democratic Party activist Christopher Hahn replied, "You're a grown man and you're attacking a child. Shame on you." Knowles responded, "I'm not. I'm attacking the Left for exploiting a mentally ill child." Hahn returned, "Relax, skinny boy; I got this." Knowles promptly added, "She is mentally ill. She has autism. She has obsessive–compulsive disorder. She has selective mutism. She had depression." The network apologized for Knowles's statement by saying his comment "was disgraceful—we apologize to Greta Thunberg and to our viewers." Knowles did not apologize and Fox stated they had "no plans" to have him on again in the future, but the channel welcomed him back shortly thereafter for a segment with host Tucker Carlson. Knowles later said, "Obviously there is nothing shameful about living with autism or any other psychiatric condition. What is shameful is exploiting children for political purposes."

In January 2020, while the first impeachment proceedings of President Donald Trump were underway, Knowles and U.S. Senator Ted Cruz launched the podcast Verdict with Ted Cruz. On January 27, Cruz announced on Twitter that Verdict had secured the top spot on the podcast charts for that week. After the impeachment trial ended with Trump's acquittal, Cruz and Knowles began to interview Washington politicians such as U.S. Senators John Barrasso, Mike Lee, and Tim Scott, Trump administration officials including then-U.S. Attorney General William Barr, Education Secretary Betsy DeVos, and White House Chief of Staff Mark Meadows. They also interviewed actors Jon Voight and Isaiah Washington.

On January 20, 2020, PragerU's website published the inaugural episode of The Book Club, a video series hosted by Knowles wherein he reviews and discusses a select book with a guest.

On November 13, 2020, Knowles was scheduled as the guest host of The Rush Limbaugh Show. After this opportunity, The Daily Wire in collaboration with Westwood One announced that Knowles would be hosting his own daily radio show on WHLD.

In February 2023, Knowles called for the elimination of "transgenderism", arguing that those who identify as transgender are "laboring a delusion, and we need to correct that delusion". At the Conservative Political Action Conference (CPAC) in March, he further stated that "there can be no middle way in dealing with transgenderism", and that "for the good of society, transgenderism must be eradicated from public life entirely." His comments were criticized by several media figures, including civil rights attorney Alejandra Caraballo, interpreting them as "genocidal". Knowles made legal threats to media outlets which reported that he was calling for the eradication of transgender people or the transgender community, stating that they were libellous, and that he was referring to "transgenderism" as an ideology; critics considered the distinction to be meaningless.

Publications
In 2017, Knowles released an empty book called Reasons to Vote for Democrats: A Comprehensive Guide. The book, which contained 266 empty pages and an extensive bibliography, became the top-selling book on Amazon. Shortly after Knowles lauded President Trump on Fox & Friends, Trump called Knowles's book "a great book for your reading enjoyment". That year, Knowles began his role as host of The Daily Wires third podcast, The Michael Knowles Show.

Knowles's second book, Speechless: Controlling Words, Controlling Minds, became a number one bestseller for hardcover nonfiction according to Publishers Weekly, and a number two bestseller for nonfiction on Audible.

Knowles wrote the introduction to the 70th anniversary edition of God and Man at Yale by William F. Buckley Jr.

Personal life
Knowles is a practicing Catholic and he attends the Traditional Latin Mass. He married Alissa Mahler in 2018 and has two sons.

Bibliography
 Reasons to Vote for Democrats: A Comprehensive Guide (2017), Threshold Editions  
 Speechless: Controlling Words, Controlling Minds (2021), Regnery Publishing

References

External links

 
 

1990 births
21st-century American male actors
American columnists
American gun rights activists
American male non-fiction writers
American media critics
American people of Italian descent
American writers of Italian descent
American political commentators
American political writers
American Roman Catholics
Living people
The Daily Wire people
Yale University alumni
Conservatism in the United States
American nationalists
People of Sicilian descent